Open Heart is an online only, continuously published, peer-reviewed open access medical journal covering all areas of cardiovascular medicine and surgery. The journal is an official journal of the British Cardiovascular Society.

The editor-in-chief is Dr Pascal Meier, Royal Brompton Hospital (UK) and University of Geneva (Switzerland)

Abstracting and Indexing 
The journal is abstracted and indexed by PubMed Central, Scopus, Google Scholar, and the Emerging Sources Citation Index.

References

External links 
 

English-language journals
Cardiology journals
BMJ Group academic journals
Academic journals associated with learned and professional societies